Enemy Soil may refer to:

 Enemy Soil (band)
 Enemy Soil (record label)